Booty Blues is a 2005 album by American blues guitarist and vocalist Eddie Kirkland, released by Hedda Records. In addition to playing guitar and singing, all 12 songs on the album were written by Kirkland.

Playing along with Kirkland on the album were:
Chris McDermott on guitars, bass, organ, trumpet, percussion, backing vocals, and samples.
Mark Greenberg on drums.
George Donchev on upright bass, drums, percussion.
Andy Plaisted on drums.
Alby Balgochian on electric guitar and bass.

Booty Blues was produced, recorded, mixed and engineered by Chris McDermott. It was mastered by Chris McDermott and Neal Ward at Silvertone Studio in Groton, Massachusetts.

Track listing
"Good, Good Day" – 3:52
"How Sweet It Is" – 4:32
"Miss You" – 3:45
"Beautiful Song" – 4:55
"Make Love to Your Brain" – 4:52
"Small Town Girl" – 3:59
"Big T.V. Screen" – 4:57
"Meet Me On The Boardwalk" – 4:56
"I Cried" – 5:28
"No Insurance" – 4:32
"Johnny's Gone" - 2:56
"I Got A Problem With The Devil" - 5:13

External links
CD Baby Music Store

2005 albums
Blues albums by American artists